Ab Zehlu (also Romanized as Āb Zehlū; also known as Āb Zālū) is a village in Qaleh-ye Khvajeh Rural District, in the Central District of Andika County, Khuzestan Province, Iran. At the 2006 census, its population was 52, in 9 families, though this information may now be outdated.

References 

Populated places in Andika County